Bhumi may refer to:

 Bhūmi, Hindu goddess of the earth
also, earth as a classical element in  Hindu tradition
 Bhūmi (Buddhism), the ten stages a Bodhisattva advances through in the path to become a Buddha
 BHUMI (organisation), a Chennai-based youth volunteer non-profit organization
 Bangabhumi, a separatist movement to create a Hindu country using southwestern Bangladesh, envisioned by Banga Sena

See also
 Bhoomi (disambiguation)
 Dell Boomi, a technology company named after the Hindu goddess